Maurica joiceyi is a moth of the family Erebidae. It was described by George Talbot in 1928. It is found in North Africa.

Subspecies
Maurica joiceyi joiceyi
Maurica joiceyi monticola (Reisser, 1934)
Maurica joiceyi chneouri (Rungs, 1951)

References

 

Spilosomina
Moths described in 1928